Dolpa Airport , also known as Juphal Airport is a domestic airport located in Juphal, Thuli Bheri serving Dolpa District, a district in Karnali Province in Nepal.  It is the only airport of the district.

History
The airport was upgraded in 2017, when the gravel runway was turned into a blacktopped runway.

Facilities

Airlines and destinations

See also
 List of airports in Nepal

References

External links
 

Airports in Nepal
Dolpa District
Buildings and structures in Karnali Province